Michael W. McCarthy (born February 1, 1971, in Youngstown, Ohio) is an American trainer of Thoroughbred racehorses best known for winning the 2018 Breeders' Cup Dirt Mile with City of Light and the 2021 Preakness Stakes with Rombauer.

California based, McCarthy worked for trainers Doug Peterson and Ben Cecil as well as Hall of Famer Todd Pletcher with whom he spent eleven years before going out on his own in 2014.

References

1971 births
Living people
American horse trainers
Sportspeople from Youngstown, Ohio